Zaal may refer to:

People
Zaal (Persian mythology) or Zāl, legendary Iranian king

Given name
Zaal, son of Alexander I of Georgia (c.1428 – after 1442), Georgian royal prince
Zaal, Duke of Aragvi (died 1660), Georgian lord
Zaali Eliava (born 1985), Georgian football player
Zaal Samadashvili (born 1953), Georgian writer
Zaal Udumashvili (born 1971), Georgian journalist and politician

Middle name
Ahmed Saif Zaal Abu Muhair, Emirati paralympic athlete 

Surname
Mohammed Bin Zaal, U.A.E. business executive
Wim Zaal (born 1935), Dutch journalist and translator

Others
IIS Zaal, original name of the Iranian frigate Alborz

See also
Zaalishvili